John Hull Dobbs Jr is an American businessman who is the president and founder of Dobbs Equity Partners LLC of Memphis, Tennessee.

Early life
He is the son of John Hull Dobbs Sr, and grandson of James K. Dobbs, who owned car dealerships and restaurant and airline catering businesses.

Dobbs graduated from the private Memphis University School in 1985. He earned a bachelor's degree from Duke University, and an MBA from the University of North Carolina Kenan-Flagler Business School.

Career
In 1998, the Dobbs Automotive Group was the third-largest car dealer in the US when it sold its 22 dealerships to AutoNation for $200 million in stock.

Personal life
Dobbs has always lived in Memphis, is married to Katherine Stobbs from Atlanta, and as of 2011 they had two children. They have donated to the Hutchison School, and they have two daughters enrolled there.

On January 5, 2021, Dobbs flew some of his friends from Memphis to Washington, DC, on his eight-seat Bombardier Challenger 300 private jet, allegedly in connection with a Stop the Steal rally. The passengers were Dobbs, George Zanone III, Carter Campbell Sr., Vince Smith and his wife, Kaki Valerius Smith, brothers Dan and Bob McEwan, and an unidentified man.

References

Living people
Duke University alumni
University of North Carolina alumni
People from Memphis, Tennessee
Year of birth missing (living people)